Pavel Winternitz  (1936–2021) was a Canadian Czech-born mathematical physicist.  He did his undergraduate studies at Prague University 
and his doctorate at Leningrad University (Ph.D. 1962) under the supervision of J. A. Smorodinsky. 
His research is on integrable systems and symmetries.

He was a member of the Mathematical Physics group at the Centre de recherches mathématiques (CRM), a national research centre in mathematics at the Université de Montréal and Professor in the Department of Mathematics and Statistics at Université de Montréal.

His work has had a strong impact in several domains of mathematical physics, and his publications are very widely cited.

In 2001, he was recipient of the CAP-CRM Prize in Theoretical and Mathematical Physics
.

In 2018, he was recipient of the Wigner medal.

He died on 13 February 2021.

References

External links 
Centre de recherches mathématiques

     P Winternitz publications in Google Scholar

Living people
Canadian physicists
Mathematical physicists
Theoretical physicists
Canadian mathematicians
Scientists from Prague
20th-century Canadian scientists
21st-century Canadian scientists
1936 births